Duke of Fernández-Miranda, is a title for Spanish nobility that is accompanied by the additional honorific dignity of Grandee of Spain (a separate legal entity from the title of nobility). It was granted by Juan Carlos I on 31 May 1977 to Torcuato Fernández-Miranda y Hevia, who played an important role in the Spanish transition to democracy. His political education of then Prince Juan Carlos (starting in 1960) during the dictatorship of Francoist Spain, and his statesmanship creating transitional laws and a constitution, and in facilitating the referendum and democratic elections after the death of Francisco Franco in 1975, were instrumental in Spain's return to democracy.

Dukes of Fernández-Miranda

History of the Dukes of Fernandez-Miranda
Torcuato Fernández-Miranda y Hevia (1915–1980), 1st Duke of Fernández-Miranda, was the former President of the Cortes Españolas and the Council of the Realm. Contrary to Franco's intent or the dictatorship to continue after his own death, Torcuato Fernández-Miranda served as a statesman in the Spanish transition to democracy, instrumental in helping King Juan Carlos I, and the people of Spain, to replace the bodies Torcuato Fernández-Miranda had been president of with a democratic Cortes Generales. He also served as First Vice President of the Government of Spain, and as interim Prime Minister of Spain after the assassination of Prime Minister Luis Carrero Blanco.
 Married María del Carmen Lozana and Abeo.

Enrique Fernández-Miranda y Lozana (1949–), 2nd Duke of Fernández-Miranda.
 Married María de los Reyes de Marcos y Sánchez

See also
List of dukes in the peerage of Spain
List of current Grandees of Spain

References 

Dukedoms of Spain
Grandees of Spain
Lists of dukes
Lists of Spanish nobility